Çakmak is an underground station on the M5 line of the Istanbul Metro in Ümraniye. The station is located on Alemdağ Street in the Saray quarter of Ümraniye. Connection to IETT city buses is available from at street level.

The M5 line operates as fully automatic unattended train operation (UTO). The station consists of an island platform with two tracks. Since the M5 is an ATO line, protective gates on each side of the platform open only when a train is in the station.

Çakmak station was opened on 21 October 2018.

Station layout

References

External links 
 Official Website of Istanbul Metro (in English)

Railway stations opened in 2018
Istanbul metro stations
Ümraniye
2018 establishments in Turkey